In physics, the Landé g-factor is a particular example of a g-factor, namely for an electron with both spin and orbital angular momenta. It is named after Alfred Landé, who first described it in 1921.

In atomic physics, the Landé g-factor is a multiplicative term appearing in the expression for the energy levels of an atom in a weak magnetic field.  The quantum states of electrons in atomic orbitals are normally degenerate in energy, with these degenerate states all sharing the same angular momentum. When the atom is placed in a weak magnetic field, however, the degeneracy is lifted.

Description 
The factor comes about during the calculation of the first-order perturbation in the energy of an atom when a weak uniform magnetic field (that is, weak in comparison to the system's internal magnetic field) is applied to the system. Formally we can write the factor as,

The orbital  is equal to 1, and under the approximation , the above expression simplifies to

Here, J is the total electronic angular momentum, L is the orbital angular momentum, and S is the spin angular momentum. The quantities gL and gS are other g-factors of an electron. You should note that for an  atom,  and for an   atom, .

A derivation
The following working is a common derivation.

Both orbital angular momentum and spin angular momentum of electron contribute to the magnetic moment. In particular, each of them alone contributes to the magnetic moment by the following form

where 

Note that negative signs in the above expressions are because an electron carries negative charge, and the value of  can be derived naturally from Dirac's equation. The total magnetic moment , as a vector operator, does not lie on the direction of total angular momentum , because the g-factors for orbital and spin part are different. In particular, the g-factor is defined as a consequence of the theorem itself

Therefore, 

One gets

See also
 Einstein–de Haas effect
 Zeeman effect

References

Atomic physics
Nuclear physics